Manx (formerly sometimes spelled Manks) is an adjective (and derived noun) describing things or people related to the Isle of Man:

 Manx people
Manx surnames
 Isle of Man

It may also refer to:

Languages
 Manx language, also known as Manx or Manx Gaelic, the native Goidelic Celtic language of the Indo-European language family of the Isle of Man
 Manx English, the English dialect of the Isle of Man

Animals and plants
 Manx cat, a cat breed with no tail or sometimes a short tail, originating on the Isle of Man
 Manx Loaghtan, a breed of sheep, originating on the Isle of Man
 Manx Rumpy, a breed of chicken, not originating on the Isle of Man
 Manx robber fly (Machimus cowini), an insect
 Manx shearwater (Puffinus puffinus), a seabird
 Isle of Man cabbage (Coincya monensis monensis), sometimes called the Manx cabbage
 Cabbage tree (New Zealand) (Cordyline australis), sometimes called the Manx palm
 Extinct animals from the Isle of Man

Other uses
 Manx Airlines, two defunct, Isle of Man-based airlines
 Manx comet, a tailless comet
 Manx Norton, a racing motorcycle
 Manx pound, the currency of the Isle of Man
 Manx Radio, the national radio station of the Isle of Man
 Manx Spirit, a clear whisky from the Isle of Man
 Meyers Manx, a dune buggy
 Varius Manx, a Polish pop group
 Handley Page Manx, an experimental British aircraft from World War II
 Harry Manx, Manx-born Canadian musician
 Manx Software (named after the cat), developers of the Aztec C compiler
 Manx, the benovalent mayor of Megakat City, a fictional character in Swat Kats

See also
 Manxman (disambiguation)

Language and nationality disambiguation pages